Skolwity  (German Skollwitten) is a village in the administrative district of Gmina Stary Dzierzgoń, within Sztum County, Pomeranian Voivodeship, in northern Poland.

The village has a population of 120.

References

Skolwity